Satya Veyash Faugoo (born सत्य वेयश फौगू, 1 April 1961) is the former Minister of Agro-Industry of Mauritius, serving in the cabinet of Navin Ramgoolam until December 2014. From 2005 to 2014, he was the 3rd Member of Parliament representing Constituency No 5,Triolet & Pamplemousses. He was elected for the first time in 1998, Constituency No 9, Bon Acceuil & Flaq as he defeated Anerood Jugnauth. He became MP and was appointed as Minister of Housing & Lands. In 1999, he was appointed as Minister of Labour.

In 2000 Faugoo was not elected following his defeat by the MSM/MMM coalition. In 2005, he was elected 2nd Member in Constituency No 5 and was appointed as Minister of Health. When the cabinet was reshuffled in 2008 Faugoo was appointed as the Minister of Agro-Industry. 

He was educated at Thames Valley University, London where he obtained his LLB and was called to the bar in 1987, belonging to the Lincoln's Inn of United Kingdom. He started practice in the same year in the State Law Office. He thus worked as barrister, Senior Magistrate in District Court and lastly was promoted to Magistrate of Intermediate Court.

Career (professional) 

 Called to the Bar of England & Wales (Lincoln’s inn), 1987
 Barrister at law
 State Law Officer
 Senior Magistrate – District Court
 Magistrate Intermediate Court

Career (political) 

 Member of the Labour Party
 Elected 2nd Member of Constituency No 9 on 5 April 1998
 Member of Parliament from April 1998 to Aug 2000
 Minister of Housing and Lands (1998-1999)
 Minister of Labour and Industrial Relations, Employment &
 Human Resources (Nov 1999 - Aug 2000)
 Re-elected 2nd Member of Constituency No 5 on 4 July 2005
 Member of Parliament as from 12 July 2005 to September 2008
 Minister of Health and Quality of Life - July 2005 to 12
 September 2008
 Minister of Agro Industry, Food Production and Security -
 13 September 2008 to 4 May 2010
 Re-elected 3rd Member of Constituency No. 5 on 6 May 2010
 Member of Parliament as from 18 May 2010 to 6 October 2014
 Minister of Agro Industry and Food Security - As from 18 May 2010 to 18 June 2013
 Minister of Agro Industry and Food Security, Attorney General - as from 18 June 2013 to 28 November 2014
 Minister of Agro Industry and Food Security - as from 18 June 2013 to December 2014

References

1961 births
Living people